Haya Harareet (20 September 1931 – 3 February 2021) was an Israeli actress and screenwriter. One of her major film roles was playing Esther, Ben Hur's love interest in the 1959 Hollywood-made film Ben-Hur.

Early life
Haya Neuberg was born in Haifa, in what was then British Mandatory of Palestine (now Israel), the second of three children. Her Ashkenazi Jewish parents, Reuben and Yocheved Neuberg, emigrated to the pre-Israeli Yishuv community of Palestine from Poland when they were young. Her father worked for the government in Tel Aviv. She received the surname Hararit (later changed to Harareet), which means "mountainous" in Hebrew, at school.

Career

Harareet began her career in Israeli films with Hill 24 Doesn't Answer (1955), which was nominated for the Palme d'Or at the 1955 Cannes Film Festival. She played opposite Virna Lisi in Francesco Maselli's The Doll that Took the Town (1957), an Italian film. Her major role as Esther in Ben-Hur (1959) remained her most widely remembered performance in international cinema. Variety, in its review of Ben-Hur, praised Harareet's performance:

Haya Harareet, an Israeli actress making her first appearance in an American film, emerges as a performer of stature. Her portrayal of Esther, the former slave and daughter of Simonides, steward of the House of Hur, is sensitive and revealing. Wyler presumably deserves considerable credit for taking a chance on an unknown. She has a striking appearance and represents a welcome departure from the standard Hollywood ingenue.

Then came 1961's  (Journey Beneath The Desert, aka The Lost Kingdom), directed by Edgar G. Ulmer and co-starring Jean-Louis Trintignant. She appeared opposite Stewart Granger in Basil Dearden's film The Secret Partner (1961), and she played the role of Dr. Madolyn Bruckner in The Interns (1962).

She co-wrote the screenplay for Our Mother's House (1967), from the novel of the same name by Julian Gloag.

Personal life and death
Harareet's first husband was Nachman Zerwanitzer, an Israeli irrigation engineer. They lived in an apartment in Tel Aviv and were divorced sometime before 1961.

Harareet's second husband was British film director Jack Clayton. They were married in High Wycombe, Buckinghamshire, England, in 1984.

On 3 February 2021, Harareet died at her home in Marlow, Buckinghamshire, England, at age 89 from natural causes. At the time of her death, she was the last surviving credited cast member of Ben Hur.

Filmography

References

External links

 

1931 births
2021 deaths
Actresses from Haifa
Jews in Mandatory Palestine
Jewish Israeli actresses
Israeli people of Polish-Jewish descent
Israeli film actresses
Israeli stage actresses
Israeli expatriates in the United Kingdom
20th-century Israeli actresses
Israeli Ashkenazi Jews